Lafayette Township is an inactive township in Clinton County in the U.S. state of Missouri.

Lafayette Township was established in 1833, taking the name of Gilbert du Motier, Marquis de Lafayette.

References

Townships in Missouri
Townships in Clinton County, Missouri